Sir Edward West (1782 – 18 August 1828) was a British judge who served in India and an economist. He is famous for his statement of the law of diminishing returns in his Essay on the Application of Capital to Land (1815, p. 2): "The principle is simply this, that in the progress of the improvement of cultivation the raising of rude produce becomes progressively more expensive, or, in other words, the ratio of the net produce of land to its gross produce is constantly diminishing." (The gross produce means the value of total output and the net is the gross minus the cost of production and exclusive of profit and rent.)

Edward was born in 1782 (baptized 5 April 1782) to John Balchen West, Receiver General for Hertfordshire. His parents died when he was still very young and Edward was brought up by an uncle, Sir Martin Browne Ffolkes, FRS at Hillington Hall near King's Lynn. Edward's sister Frances later married Captain Lane of the 47th Regiment of Foot. West studied at Harrow and then at University College, Oxford. He graduated first class and was distinguished in the classics and mathematics. In 1814 he was called to the Bar at the Inner Temple.

In 1815 he wrote an essay arguing against the "impolicy of any great restriction on the importation of corn" which was appreciated by the economist David Ricardo. In 1825 he wrote a pamphlet on the "Price of Corn and Wages of Labour" in which he expressed what is now known as the law of diminishing returns. This little known essay was reprinted in 1903 by Johns Hopkins University with a preface by Dr Jacob Hollander. 

Edward West married Lucretia ffolkes, daughter of his guardian uncle, on 26 August 1822 at Marylebone Church. West was appointed Recorder of the King's Court of Bombay and knighted in the same year. The couple reached Bombay on 1 February 1823. He became Chief Justice on 8 May 1823. He chose to enforce order leading to being seen unfavourably by many officers in the employment of the East India Company. He suspended several barristers and dismissed some officers, notably William Erskine, Master in Equity, suspected of improbity (mostly taking bribes in cases). Mountstuart Elphinstone and some other Europeans went on the side of Erskine. Erskine's position was taken by Fenwick, a nephew of West. George Norton, a recently appointed Advocate General for Bombay introduced fees that were seven times that received in England. Norton and West clashed on this order.

West and Lucretia had a daughter Fanny Anna in 1826. West died at Poona where he was buried. Lucretia died during the birth of her second child (the infant son also died) in 1828, shortly after the death of her husband. A scholarship was started in Bombay by the citizens in his honour.

References

External links
West on encyclopedia.com

British economists
1782 births
1828 deaths
Judges of the Bombay High Court
People educated at Harrow School
Alumni of University College, Oxford